DU&ICH ("You and I") was a German LGBT magazine. DU&ICH distributed copies monthly. It was published by German company Jackwerth Verlag. The seat of the publishing company was in Berlin. It was in circulation between 1969 and 2014.

History and profile
DU&ICH was founded in 1969. On 1 October 1969 the first edition was published. Founder of DU&ICH was Egon Manfred Strauss. First chief editor was Udo J. Erlenhardt. In the last 40 years over 465 editions of DU&ICH were printed. The magazine was the oldest German gay magazine —other magazines launched after DU&ICH were him in April 1970 and DON in May 1970.

In the 1970s, journalist Alexander Ziegler worked for DU&ICH. Journalist Dirk Ludigs worked for the magazine in the 2000s and Andreas Hergeth was the chief editor.

Later the magazine (alongside other popular magazines such as Spartacus, him, DOM and ADAM) have been criticised for blurring the lines between ages of consent and encouraging sex tourism (including child sex tourism) in their fetishised portrayals of non-white youths. Many of the sexual images in DU&ICH undoubtedly included children under 18; however, in 1975 the West German government only forbade imagery of under-14s in sexually explicit poses.

The magazine was cancelled in Summer 2014.

See also
List of magazines in Germany

References

External links 

 Official website for DU&ICH
 Queer:Vierzig Jahre DU&ICH 
 Siegessäule: 40 Jahre Du&Ich - „Schwule Grundversorgung“ 

1969 establishments in West Germany
2014 disestablishments in Germany
Defunct magazines published in Germany
Gay men's magazines
German-language magazines
LGBT-related magazines published in Germany
Magazines established in 1969
Magazines disestablished in 2014
Magazines published in Berlin
Monthly magazines published in Germany